Erill la Vall is a locality located in the municipality of Vall de Boí, in Province of Lleida province, Catalonia, Spain. As of 2020, it has a population of 97.

Geography 
Erill la Vall is located 139km north of Lleida.

References

Populated places in the Province of Lleida